The Ministry of Labour and Social Security of Jamaica oversees Social Security and Welfare, Education Affairs and Services, and Labour Relations Employment Services. The head offices of the labour and social security divisions are in Kingston.

As of 2020, the Minister of Labour and Social Security is The Honourable Karl Samuda CD, MP

See also

 Other ministries of Labour
 Other ministries of Social Security

References

External links
Ministry of Labour and Social Security

Ministries and agencies of the government of Jamaica
Jamaica
Social affairs ministries